(S)-β-bisabolene synthase (EC 4.2.3.55) is an enzyme with systematic name (2E,6E)-farnesyl-diphosphate diphosphate-lyase ((S)-β-bisabolene-forming). This enzyme catalyses the following chemical reaction

 (2E,6E)-farnesyl diphosphate  (S)-β-bisabolene + diphosphate

The synthesis of (S)-β-macrocarpene from (2E,6E)-farnesyl diphosphate proceeds in two steps.

References

External links 
 

EC 4.2.3